Face TV may refer to:

Face TV (Bosnia and Herzegovina)
Face TV (New Zealand)